Helops is a genus of darkling beetles (insects belonging to the family Tenebrionidae) in the subfamily Tenebrioninae.

Species 
 Helops aereus Germar, 1824
 Helops atticus Redtenbach in Ungern, 1867† 
 Helops cisteloides Germar
 Helops coeruleus (Linnaeus, 1758)
 Helops glabriventris Reitter, 1885
 Helops gracilis Bland, 1863
 Helops meissneri Heer, 1847† 
 Helops molassicus Heer, 1883† 
 Helops rossii Germar, 1817
 Helops thoracicus Grimm, 1991
 Helops wetteravicus Heyden, 1865†

References

External links 
 Biolib
 Fauna Europaea 

Tenebrioninae
Tenebrionidae genera
Beetles of Europe